The 2015 Monte-Carlo Rolex Masters was a tennis tournament for male professional players, played from 12 April through 19 April 2015, on outdoor clay courts. It was the 109th edition of the annual Monte Carlo Masters tournament, which was sponsored by Rolex for the seventh time. It took place at the Monte Carlo Country Club in Roquebrune-Cap-Martin, France (though billed as Monte Carlo, Monaco).

Points and prize money

Points distribution
Because the Monte Carlo Masters is the non-mandatory Masters 1000 event, special rules regarding points distribution are in place. The Monte Carlo Masters counts as one of a player's 500 level tournaments, while distributing Masters 1000 points.

Prize money
The total prize money pot for the 2015 competition is €3,288,530, distributed throughout both competitions.

Singles main draw entrants

Seeds

Rankings are as of April 6, 2015

Other entrants
The following players received wildcards into the main draw:
  Benjamin Balleret
  Gaël Monfils
  Lucas Pouille
  Mikhail Youzhny

The following players used a protected ranking to gain entry into the main draw:
  Florian Mayer

The following players received entry from the qualifying draw:
  Norbert Gombos
  Denis Kudla
  Andrey Kuznetsov
  Benoît Paire
  Albert Ramos-Viñolas
  Édouard Roger-Vasselin
  Diego Schwartzman

The following players received entry as lucky losers:
  Robin Haase
  Jan-Lennard Struff

Withdrawals
Before the tournament
  Nicolás Almagro →replaced by Robin Haase
  Julien Benneteau →replaced by Víctor Estrella Burgos
  Pablo Cuevas →replaced by Borna Ćorić
  Richard Gasquet →replaced by Andreas Haider-Maurer
  Nick Kyrgios →replaced by Pablo Carreño Busta
  Sam Querrey →replaced by Jan-Lennard Struff

Retirements
  Víctor Estrella Burgos
  Milos Raonic (right foot injury)

Doubles main draw entrants

Seeds

 Rankings are as of April 6, 2015

Other entrants
The following pairs received wildcards into the doubles main draw:
  Romain Arneodo /  Benjamin Balleret
  Benoît Paire /  Stan Wawrinka

The following pair received entry as alternates:
  Robin Haase /  Raven Klaasen
  Andreas Seppi /  Sergiy Stakhovsky

Withdrawals
Before the tournament
  Nicolás Almagro (ankle injury)
  Ernests Gulbis (stomach illness)

Retirements
  Andreas Seppi (hip injury)

Finals

Singles

  Novak Djokovic defeated  Tomáš Berdych, 7–5, 4–6, 6–3

Doubles

  Bob Bryan /  Mike Bryan defeated  Simone Bolelli /  Fabio Fognini, 7–6(7–3), 6–1

References

External links
 
 Association of Tennis Professionals (ATP) tournament profile